Shippen can refer to:

People
 Edward Shippen, second mayor of Philadelphia
 Edward Shippen (II), wealthy merchant and government official in colonial Philadelphia
 Edward Shippen (III), lawyer, judge, government official, and prominent figure in colonial and post-revolutionary Philadelphia
 John Shippen, African-American golfer
 Peggy Shippen, second wife of Benedict Arnold
 Robert Shippen, English academic administrator at the University of Oxford
 William Shippen Sr., represented Pennsylvania in the Continental Congress
 William Shippen, Jr., the second Surgeon General of the Continental Army
 William Shippen (MP), English Tory Member of Parliament

Places
 Shippen Township, Cameron County, Pennsylvania
 Shippen Township, Tioga County, Pennsylvania